Acacia excelsa, also known as ironwood, rosewood, bunkerman and doodlallie is a tree of the genus Acacia and the subgenus Plurinerves that is endemic to inland parts of north-eastern Australia. In the Gamilaraay language it is known as dhan, gayan or gan.<ref name=atlas>{{cite web|url=https://bie.ala.org.au/species/https://id.biodiversity.org.au/node/apni/2895212#names|title=Acacia excelsa''' Benth. Dhan,Gayan,Gan in Yuwaalayaay|accessdate=2 October 2020|work=Atlas of Living Australia|publisher=Global Biodiversity Information Facility}}</ref>

Description
It has hard, fissured and deep grey coloured bark and glabrous branchlets. The wood of the tree has a scent similar to cut violets. Like most species of Acacia it has phyllodes rather than true leaves. The glabrous, evergreen phyllodes are straight or slightly curved and have a narrowly elliptic or narrowly oblong shape. It blooms between March and June in its natural range producing simple inflorescences that occur in groups of one to four usually in the axils. Following flowering it will produce brittle firmly papery seed pods that are flat and straight but are constricted between seeds.

Taxonomy
The species was first formally described by the botanist George Bentham in 1848 as part of Thomas Mitchell's work Journal of an Expedition into the Interior of Tropical Australia. It was reclassified as Racosperma excelsum by Leslie Pedley in 1987 then transferred back to genus Acacia in 2006. The specific epithet means tall and is in reference to the tall habit of the tree.

Distribution
It has a wide-ranging but scattered distribution throughout inland parts of southern inland Queensland extending into northern and central New South Wales. In New South Wales it is found as far south as Condbolin and as far east as Warialda. It is found growing in sandy loamy soils as a part of open woodland or savannah grassland communities.

Uses
The bark of this species, like all Acacias'', contain appreciable amounts of tannins and are astringent and can be used for medical purposes including for the treatment of diarrhoea and dysentery when used internally or used to treat wounds, haemorrhoids or some eye problems when used externally. The trees can also produce gum from the stems which is also taken internally to treat haemorrhoids and diarrhoea. The wood produced by the tree is  close-grained, very tough and hard and elastic and is suitable for cabinet-work and instrument fretboards. It was used by Indigenous Australian peoples to make boomerangs and spearthrowers.

See also
 List of Acacia species

References

excelsa
Flora of Queensland
Flora of New South Wales
Plants described in 1848
Taxa named by George Bentham